Launch Complex 36 (LC-36)—formerly known as Space Launch Complex 36 (SLC-36) from 1997 to 2010—is a launch complex at Cape Canaveral Space Force Station in Brevard County, Florida. It was used for Atlas launches by NASA and the U.S. Air Force from 1962 until 2005.

Blue Origin has leased the launch site since 2015 in order to build a new launch site for launching the company's orbital rockets.  Orbital launches are expected to begin from LC-36 no earlier than Q4 2022, and the first launch vehicle slated to launch there is New Glenn, under development by Blue Origin since 2012. As of 2019, LC-36 is under major construction, including for a large launch pad for the launch vehicle with nearby Horizontal Integration Facility, lightning tower, water tower, and propellant tank farm for liquid methane and liquid oxygen.

Historically, the complex consisted of two launch pads, SLC-36A and SLC-36B, and was the launch site for the Pioneer, Surveyor, and Mariner probes in the 1960s and 1970s. There were a total of 145 launches from LC 36 during the period that the US government operated the launch complex in the first five decades of spaceflight.  The Atlas rockets launched from Complex 36 were subsequently superseded by the Atlas V launch vehicle which launches from Complex 41 at Cape Canaveral beginning in 2002.

History 
LC-36 was originally constructed by the US government in the early 1960s in order to launch the Atlas-Centaur rocket, with first launch in May 1962.

LC-36A was the scene of the biggest on-pad explosion in Cape history when Atlas-Centaur AC-5 fell back onto the pad on March 2, 1965. The accident spurred NASA to complete work on LC-36B which had been abandoned when it was 90% finished.
LC-36B was built near LC-36A "due to the Atlas-Centaur’s increasing flight rate – and low reliability early on."

The pad was modified during the late 1980s to be able to launch the Atlas I, with first launch occurring in July 1990, and was subsequently modified two additional times during the 1990s to launch the Atlas II and Atlas III launch vehicles.  Atlas III made its sixth and final launch from LC-36 in 2005.

There were a total of 68 and 77 launches from pads 36A and 36B, respectively, while the US government operated the launch complex in the first five decades of spaceflight.

Interregnum 

The pad was unused from mid-2005 through 2015.

The legacy Atlas-Centaur umbilical towers of both pads were demolished in 2006. The mobile service towers were both demolished in controlled explosions on June 16, 2007. Tower B was demolished at 13:59 GMT (09:59 EDT) and tower A followed twelve minutes later at 14:11 (10:11 EDT).

In 2008, Aviation Week magazine reported that the U.S. Air Force committed to lease Launch Complex 36 to Space Florida for future use by the Athena III launch system, 
but that program never moved forward.

In March 2010, the USAF 45th Space Wing issued real property licenses to Space Florida for Space Launch Complexes 36 and 46 at Cape Canaveral Space Force Station.

Moon Express leased the pad in February 2015 from Space Florida as a development and test site for its commercial lunar operations and its lunar lander flight test vehicles.

In 2015, Blue Origin signed a long-term lease of launch site from Space Florida for launching Blue's orbital rockets, after Space Florida had previously leased the facility from the USAF in 2010 in order to facilitate commercial use of the land and facilities since the Air Force no longer required use of the launch complex. Moon Express and Blue Origin shared LC-36, delineated into LC-36A and LC-36B respectively, until Moon Express announced its relocation to Launch Complexes 17 and 18 in 2016, allowing Blue Origin full use of the LC-36 facility. In early 2016, Blue intended to begin orbital launches by 2020, as of 2019 they are expected to begin from LC-36 no earlier than 2023.

Blue Origin 
On September 15, 2015, Blue Origin announced it would use Launch Complex 36 for launches of its orbital launch vehicle later in the decade.
Blue had the lease in place for Launch Complex 36 by late 2015 from the Florida state space agency, Space Florida, and will manufacture their new BE-4-powered orbital launch vehicle at the nearby Exploration Park, also a part of the Space Florida land complex.

By October 2015, the pad design and configuration was not yet publicly known.  Blue broke ground for the facility to initiate construction activity on the site in June 2016.

By March 2016, the first launch of the Blue orbital launch vehicle New Glenn was estimated to be no earlier than 2020 and that target date had not changed by the time high-level specifications for the new launcher were unveiled in September 2016, nor by the time construction of the launch site was well underway in September 2018.
New Glenn will be a very large -diameter vehicle.  The first stage will be powered by seven BE-4 methane/oxygen engines producing  total thrust at launch.  The first stage will be reusable and is designed to land vertically.

Blue has also leased the adjacent land—formerly known as LC-11—to use as a ground-based rocket engine test facility. Construction of the new launch complex and engine test facility was still underway in September 2018.

Although Blue has been publicly quiet about the status of the launch complex construction, high-resolution aerial photography released after Hurricane Dorian in September 2019 showed that facility foundation work is in place—including for the horizontal integration facility, the launch service structure, lightning tower, and water tower—and above-ground steel construction has commenced.  The propellant tank farm is in the process of being installed.

Gallery

See also
List of Cape Canaveral and Merritt Island launch sites

References 

Cape Canaveral Space Force Station
Launch complexes of the United States Space Force
Rocket launch sites in the United States
1962 establishments in Florida